Richard Heywood may refer to:
Richard Heywood (bishop) (1867–1955), Anglican bishop
Richard Heywood (MP), member of parliament for Helston in 1545
Richard Heywood (actor) in The 14

See also
T. R. H. Thomson (Richard Heywood Thomson), English explorer and naturalist
Dick Heyward, deputy executive director of UNICEF between 1949 and 1981